Bahramju (also Romanized as Bahrāmjū and Bahrām Ḩow) is a village in Robat Rural District, in the Central District of Khorramabad County, Lorestan Province, Iran. At the 2006 census, its population was 268, in 46 families.

References 

Towns and villages in Khorramabad County